The Three Stooges (promoted as The Three Stooges: The Movie) is a 2012 American slapstick comedy film based on the film shorts from 1934 to 1959 starring the comedy trio of the same name. It was produced, written and directed by the Farrelly brothers and co-written by Mike Cerrone.  It stars Chris Diamantopoulos, Sean Hayes, and Will Sasso, re-creating the eponymous characters played by Moe Howard, Larry Fine and Curly Howard.

The story places the Stooges in a then-modern setting. After over a decade of casting problems, principal photography took place from May to July 2011. The film was released on April 13, 2012 by 20th Century Fox.

Plot
The film has three acts, referred to as episodes (a reference to how the original Three Stooges short films were packaged for television by Columbia Pictures).

Act / Episode 1: More Orphan Than Not
35 years in the past, the children at the Sisters of Mercy Orphanage are playing soccer with an old soda can in the frontyard. Sister Mary-Mengele, the meanest and strictest nun in the orphanage, tells them to go inside and do their chores. They try singing "Everybody is Special", but she tells them to shut up and go work. Later, three destructive infants, Moe, Larry and Curly, are thrown in a duffel bag onto the orphanage's doorstep from an unknown person's car. The trio subsequently wreaks havoc in the place, terrifying the nuns—especially Sister Mary-Mengele, who has always hated them.

Ten years later, desperate to be rid of the three, the nuns tell a prospectively adoptive couple that the trio are the only three children available. They're then forced to add a fourth for consideration when a boy named Teddy wanders into the room. The couple, the Harters, decides to pick Moe; but when he requests that Larry and Curly join him, they take him back to the orphanage and choose Teddy instead. Hiding his true motives, Moe tells Larry and Curly that he came back because the Harters were only going to make him do chores.

25 years later, in the present, the trio are adults, still living at the orphanage and working as maintenance men. Monsignor Ratliffe arrives and tells Mother Superior that the orphanage must be closed, and she tells Sister Mary-Mengele to fetch the trio. The three are trying to fix the malfunctioning bell on the roof; but when Larry removes the bell's "DO NOT REMOVE" tag (misreading it as "Donut Remover"), it falls and injures Sister Mary-Mengele just as she arrives. When they go to the Mother Superior, another accident causes Monsignor Ratliffe to fall on top of the nuns.  Moe, Larry and Curly, thinking he is "getting fresh" with the nuns, attack him, until Mother Superior stops them. Ratliffe will not adopt them either as he is on official business.

Mother Superior tells everyone that the orphanage must close at the end of the month. Ratliffe tells the nuns they will be spread around the diocese and the children will be sent to foster homes unless they can raise $830,000 in 30 days. The trio volunteers to try to raise the money. Some of the nuns think they can't succeed, as they know only nuns and kids, but Mother Superior thinks otherwise.

Act / Episode 2: The Bananas Split
A subplot involves a woman named Lydia, who wants to kill her husband so she can be with her lover, Mac, and inherit her husband's considerable fortune. She finds the trio and offers to pay them the money they need to take care of the hit job, pretending that Mac is her terminally ill husband that wants to be put out of his misery and have him switch with her real husband when the moment comes. They botch the job by promptly letting Curly push Mac in front of a bus and leave Mac in traction in the hospital. When they try to visit Mac in the hospital to finish the job (failing to do so as Mac tells them that the incident cured his illness), they are chased by two police officers throughout the hospital and escape by jumping off the roof using a fire hose. They end up running into a now grown-up Teddy, who invites them to his anniversary party and an opportunity to settle at Teddy's home, but Moe refuses.

It is then revealed that Teddy is actually Lydia's husband. The trio's next scheme for raising the money is selling farm-raised salmon, with them scattering live salmon on a golf range and watering them like produce. But the same police officers from the hospital arrive at the golf course to arrest them and the trio gets chased off the golf course and they hide in an old building (getting in by using Curly as a battering ram to bust down the door). Inside, after having a slapstick fight, Larry and Curly scold Moe for rejecting Teddy's invitation and his father's earlier adoption attempt; they could have used his adoptive parents' wealth to help save the orphanage. Hurt, Moe tells them to leave, saying that he is tired of being with them. After deciding to split up, they leave the old building, with Moe left inside alone. Then it turns out that they were all on stage in front of an audition crew who select Moe to be the newest cast member of Jersey Shore as "Dyna-Moe".

Final Act / Episode 3: No Moe Mr. Nice Guy
Larry and Curly are getting along well without Moe, but then they start to worry about him, and decide to return to the orphanage to find him. There, they find out a girl named Murph is very ill but has not been taken to the hospital because the orphanage has no medical insurance. Sister Mary-Mengele angrily tells them that no one will insure the orphanage due to the trio's numerous accidents and injuries over the years, and the $830,000 is needed in order to cover medical bills that accumulated over the years.

Larry and Curly later meet up with Teddy's adopted father at his office to talk about what happened with the orphanage. Teddy's father confesses that Moe wanted him to go back for his friends to adopt them, and he thought three kids would be too many to handle, so he gave Moe back and took Teddy in his place. Then Larry and Curly discover a picture of Teddy and Mr. Harter with Lydia and Mac, and realize that Teddy is the husband that Lydia wanted to murder. In addition to this, they feel guilty for rebuking Moe in not accepting the Harter's adoption and decide to go find him.

Meanwhile, Moe has been causing a lot of havoc on Jersey Shore by slapping, eye-poking and head-bopping the cast members and not putting up with their spoiled antics. The cast goes to the producer and tells him to kick Moe off of the show or they will sue him. The producer then informs them that the show is all about the ratings and not them. Larry and Curly finally go to the set of Jersey Shore to reunite with Moe and they all head to the anniversary party where they show up to thwart the murder plot, getting in as balloon men.

When they get inside, Curly gives all the balloons to a little girl and she floats up into the air. Later, they get chased by the angry Lydia and Mac after the same girl's balloons are popped and she falls onto the wedding cake, destroying it. Moe, Larry, and Curly are chased into Teddy's bedroom, finding Teddy on the bed, drowsy. Mac then draws a gun on the trio, but Mr. Harter appears and tells Mac to put his gun down. Mac then confesses that Lydia was "calling the shots", but Mr. Harter admits that he was the real mastermind and Lydia was working for him. He married into the money and was incensed to find out the money was left to Teddy and not him when Teddy's mother died years earlier.

They are taken for a ride, but the car crashes into a lake when Curly's pet rat Nippy digs into Lydia’s breasts. They all escape when Curly farted, and Moe ignites it with some "easy-light, waterproof safety matches" that Larry had, causing enough of an explosion to blow out the windows. Once they are back on land, Mr. Harter, Lydia, and Mac are arrested, and Teddy thanks the trio for saving him. When the trio requests the $830,000 from Teddy, he declines, stating he refuses to help the same orphanage that gave him up to a father that tried to kill him.

A couple of months later, the trio return to the now-condemned/abandoned orphanage. They feel bad for feeling like failures, but then they hear kids laughing, swimming and playing. When they investigate, they find out a brand new orphanage was built next door, complete with a swimming pool, a basketball court, and a tennis court. They soon learn that the money came from the Jersey Shore'''s producers who consider this as an advance payment in relation to a new reality show, Nuns vs. Nitwits, in which the entire trio will take part.

Murph is revealed to be perfectly fine and her illness was due to metal poisoning (with Larry saying he has always suspected there was too much iron in the water). Then she, along with her friend Peezer and his brother Weezer (the latter thought to have been lost forever to a foster home), will be adopted by Teddy and his new fiancée, Ling, who was Teddy's father's secretary. In the end, after Curly accidentally knocks Sister Mary-Mengele into the pool with a folded-up diving board as the orphange celebrates the adoption, the trio run away, bounce off some trampolines over the hedge and onto some mules, on which they clumsily ride away into the distance.

Post-script epilogue
An epilogue consists of two actors playing Bobby and Peter Farrelly, explaining that the stunts were all done by professionals, showing the foam rubber props used in the film for the trio to hit one another, demonstrating the fake eye-poke trick (to the eyebrows), and advising children not to try any of the stunts at home.

During the end credits, a music video plays showing the Stooges and Sister Rosemary performing "It's a Shame", originally recorded by The Spinners in 1970, interspersed with excerpts from deleted scenes and a couple of brief outtakes. Though credited to "The Spinners and The Three Stooges", Hudson's own distinctive vocals can also be heard.

Cast
 Sean Hayes as Larry Fine, the smartest and most relaxed member of the Stooges
 Lance Chantiles-Wertz as young Larry
 Will Sasso as Curly Howard, the goofy younger brother of Moe and the stupidest member of the Stooges
 Robert Capron as young Curly
 Chris Diamantopoulos as Moe Howard, the aggressive older brother of Curly and short-tempered leader of the Stooges
 Skyler Gisondo as young Moe
 Jane Lynch as Mother Superior, the head nun of the orphanage in which the Stooges grew up
 Sofía Vergara as Lydia Harter, Teddy's former wife who wants to exploit the stooges and murder Teddy to gain his inheritance
 Jennifer Hudson as Sister Rosemary, a nun who works at the orphanage
 Craig Bierko as Mac Mioski, Lydia's former lover and henchman
 Stephen Collins as Mr. Harter, Teddy's adoptive father, a corrupt lawyer who married into money, rather than for love; wants to murder his Teddy out of spite because his late wife and Teddy's deceased adoptive mother left her inheritance to Teddy rather than himself
 Larry David as Sister Mary-Mengele, a bad-tempered and rude nun at the orphanage, who has a massive grudge against the Stooges
 Kirby Heyborne as Theodore J. "Teddy" Harter, a long-lost friend of the Stooges who they met at the orphanage
 Emy Coligado as Ling, Mr. Harter's former, kind secretary who eventually becomes Teddy's fiance after he divorces Lydia
 Avalon Robbins as Murph Harter, a sick girl at the orphanage who is a friend of the Stooges; adopted by Teddy and Ling
 Max Charles as Peezer Harter, Weezer's brother, Murph's best friend and a friend of the Stooges; adopted by Teddy and Ling
 Reid Meadows as Weezer Harter, Peezer's brother; adopted by Teddy and Ling.
 Brian Doyle-Murray as Monsignor Ratliffe
 Lin Shaye as Nursery Nurse, a nurse who works at the hospital
 Caitlin Colford as Katilyn, a nurse who first notices the Stooges when they first come to the orphanage
 Carly Craig as Mrs. Harter, Mr. Harter's wife who adopted Teddy and leaves the entire inheritance to Teddy over her husband after she dies in a hunting accident 
 Kate Upton as Sister Bernice, a kind hearted sexy nun at the orphanage
 Marianne Leone as Sister Ricarda, a nun at the orphanage
 Isaiah Mustafa as Ralph, a producer for Jersey Shore Nicole "Snooki" Polizzi as herself
 Mike "The Situation" Sorrentino as himself
 Jennifer "JWoww" Farley as herself
 Ronnie Ortiz-Magro as himself
 Samantha "Sweetheart" Giancola as herself
 Dwight Howard as himself, a basketball player who teaches at the new orphanage
 Lee Armstrong as Officer Armstrong
 Roy Jenkins as Officer Mycroft
 Justin Lopez and Antonio Sabàto Jr. as Peter & Bobby Farrelly, the co-directors of the film, who are both seen during the post-script epilogue explaining the stunts

Production
Development and writing
A Three Stooges film set in the modern day had been in development during the show's 60th anniversary; Mad About You creator Danny Jacobson wrote and developed a version in 1997 that had Phil Hartman attached to play Moe. Conundrum Entertainment's Bradley Thomas became attached to The Three Stooges around 2000 with Columbia Pictures. In March 2001, Warner Bros. bought the feature rights from C3 Entertainment and Peter and Bobby Farrelly became involved. They along with co-writer Mike Cerrone completed the script in mid-to-late 2002 and began shopping it. In 2004, with no talent being attached to the project, their rights expired and it was acquired by First Look Studios and C3 Entertainment. In November 2008, Metro-Goldwyn-Mayer acquired the Farrelly's Warner Bros. scripts and the rights from C3 Entertainment, and was given a budget of $40 million with a release date of November 20, 2009. In March 2009, after struggling with casting delays, the release date was pushed to 2010, but the filmmakers still did not have a cast set. In November 2010, MGM filed bankruptcy and the following month the project was taken over by 20th Century Fox in hopes to have released the film in 2011.

The Farrellys said that they were not going to do a biopic or remake, but instead new Three Stooges episodes set in the present day. The film was divided into three segments, each with a stand-alone story, and each being 27 minutes long. The Farrellys aimed to receive a PG rating from the MPAA, while still incorporating physical comedy. In Britain several images were cut before the film achieved the equivalent rating. The Farrellys have also said it would have "non-stop slapping, more in the tone of Dumb and Dumber than we've done. Our goal is 85 minutes of laughs in a film that will be very respectful of who the Stooges were. It's by far the riskiest project we've ever done, without question, but it is also the one closest to our hearts."

Casting

In March 2009, Benicio del Toro and Hank Azaria were in consideration to play the lead role of Moe Howard. The role of Moe went to Chris Diamantopoulos. Diamantopoulos revealed that he showed up to the audition in full costume, only to see a sign out front asking to "not show up in character". Over six months, he was called back fourteen times. Afterwards, he got a call from the Farrellys asking him if he was going to do the movie with them. Confused, he called his agent, who revealed that he had gotten the part, but that the agent (who, Diamantopoulos had stated previously, was against the role) was waiting on telling him. Angered, he fired his agent on the spot and accepted the role.

Sean Penn was already set to play Larry Fine but dropped out to concentrate on his charitable efforts in Haiti. Sean Hayes was chosen to play Larry. Jim Carrey was set to play Curly Howard and gained 40 pounds for the role but ultimately dropped out because of not wanting to endanger his health gaining 60 to 70 pounds. The role went to Will Sasso. Johnny Knoxville, Andy Samberg and Shane Jacobson were all on the short list to play Moe, Larry and Curly, respectively, with Knoxville supposedly having turned it down as he refused to commit to doing an impersonation. As the Farrellys note in the DVD/Blu-ray featurette on casting the picture, Sasso was cast as Curly despite being considerably taller than the other Stooges (the original Curly was roughly the same height as Moe and Larry).

In December 2010, Richard Jenkins was in talks to play Mother Superior in the film. In February 2011, Cher was considered but Jane Lynch secured the role. Larry David plays another nun in the film called Sister Mary-Mengele, a character named after the infamous Nazi doctor. Sofía Vergara was cast as Lydia. Stephen Collins was cast as Mr. Harter and Carly Craig as his wife, Mrs. Harter. The cast of Jersey Shore (Nicole Polizzi, Michael Sorrentino, Sammi Giancola, Jennifer Farley, and Ronnie Ortiz-Magro) have cameos in the film.

Filming
On a reported budget of $30 million, principal photography started on May 9, 2011, in downtown Atlanta, Georgia and wrapped on July 20, 2011. Scenes were shot at the Fairlie-Poplar Historic District around 5 Points Sports Building on the corner of Peachtree St., Edgewood Ave., and Decatur St. on the evening and night of May 13 and wrapped the next day. Other locations included Piedmont Park, Emory Saint Joseph's Hospital, Zoo Atlanta, and Colony Square. In June, production moved to Cartersville and shot scenes near Woodland High School. After the cast of the Jersey Shore arrived on July 18, 2011, they shot scenes at the Atlanta Civic Center. During the last two days of filming, scenes were shot at an Ansley Park home. Filming concluded on July 22, 2011, at the Miami Seaquarium, a popular marine life park in Florida, capturing a scene in their dolphin tank.

Release
Appearance on WWE Raw
To promote the film, Diamantopoulos, Hayes, and Sasso appeared as the Stooges on WWE Raw on April 9, 2012. They acted in several scenes, the first with Santino Marella, before later taking to the ring where they were booed by an infuriated crowd before Sasso, dressed as Hulk Hogan, received a chokeslam by Kane.

Reception
Box office
On its opening weekend in US, The Three Stooges earned $17.1 million and debuted second behind The Hunger Games. The film grossed $54,819,301 in the box office, and at least $25,013,185 through US home video sales.

Critical reception
Rotten Tomatoes gives the film a rating of 51% based on reviews from 150 critics; the average rating is 5.4/10. The site's critical consensus reads, "While nowhere near as painful as it could have been, The Three Stooges fails to add fresh laughs to the Stooges' inestimable cinematic legacy." Metacritic gives the film a score of 56 out of 100, based on reviews from 26 critics, indicating "mixed or average reviews". Audiences polled by CinemaScore gave the film an average grade of "B-" on an A+ to F scale. Despite the mixed reviews, Diamantopoulos, Hayes, and Sasso were praised for their performances as Moe, Larry, and Curly.

Todd McCarthy of The Hollywood Reporter described it as "[A] funny, good-hearted resuscitation of Hollywood's beloved lowbrow lunkheads", while Manohla Dargis of The New York Times lauded the film as a "thoroughly enjoyable paean to Moe, Larry and Curly and the art of the eye poke". Spill.com gave the movie a fairly good review, insisting that the movie is great for families, and hardcore Stooge-fans will not be disappointed. They also went on to praise the actors for their portrayal of the Stooges, saying the likeness was uncanny, and perhaps even Oscar-worthy. Roger Ebert gave the movie two-and-a-half out of four stars, stating "The Farrelly brothers have made probably the best Three Stooges movie it's possible to make in 2012, and perhaps ever since the Stooges stopped making them themselves." Some critics, however, complained about the forced pop culture references such as cameos by Jersey Shore cast members which were presumably done to ensure the movie would have youth appeal and not simply be a nostalgia trip for older audiences.

Betsy Sherman of The Boston Phoenix gave it three out of four stars, saying it was "funny and faithful", and added that the film contains "stories that could have graced [the Stooges]' 1930s shorts (raise money to save an orphanage, stumble into a greedy wife's plot) onto the present and imagine how they'd interpret modern concepts (farm-raised salmon)".

Peter Travers of Rolling Stone magazine gave it two stars out of four, commenting that "the movie is a mixed bag. The gags don't blossom with repetition. The Stooges were always better in short doses. And 90 minutes of PG nyuk-nyuk-nyuk can seem like an eternity. For the Farrellys, The Three Stooges is a labor of love. For non-believers, it's merely a labor." Travers also praised the cast, stating "The actors deserve a full-throated woo-woo-woo!" adding that "Hayes, Sasso, and Diamantopoulos do themselves and the Stooges proud." James White of Empire Magazine gave the film a two out of five stars, saying, "The mooted Stooges - Sean Penn, Jim Carrey, Benicio del Toro - dodged a bullet judging by this muddle of creaky slapstick and laugh-free plotting."

Bill Wine of KYW Newsradio 1060 in Philadelphia commented that "no one's going to confuse The Three Stooges with a transcendent movie anytime soon, but the Farrellys do capture and reproduce the anarchic spirit and uninhibited essence of the Stooges—soitenly and poifectly, as the Stooges would put it—and remind us why they had such a hold on some of us in decades past. The three leads are expert mimics—especially Hayes...they acquit themselves admirably..."

Criticism for anti-catholicism
Bill Donohue, president of the Catholic League anti-defamation organization, released a statement condemning the movie on the grounds of disrespectful portrayals of Catholics, specifically nuns. Donohue claims that the movie is evidence of increasing hostility towards religion and Catholics in Hollywood, commenting "In the 1950s, Hollywood generally avoided crude fare and was respectful of religion. Today, it specializes in crudity and trashes Christianity, especially Catholicism." Donohue added that the movie "is not just another remake: it is a cultural marker of sociological significance, and what it says about the way we've changed is not encouraging."

Donohue pinpoints one scene in which the film pushes the envelope with its portrayals of two unusual nuns, respectively portrayed by model Kate Upton, and Curb Your Enthusiasm star/creator Larry David. Both are potential causes for the offense for different reasons, as Moviefone reports:

To resolve the issue, the Farelly brothers reshot the scene with Larry pointing out Sister Bernice, still wearing the "nun-kini" while on lifeguard duty at the new orphanage's pool. Close-up footage of Upton exiting the pool in front of a group of children appears in the film's trailer, but not in the movie itself nor DVD/Blu-ray deleted scenes; in the final film, she is only seen sitting in a chair and briefly in the background of a group shot while in her swimsuit (in her other scenes, she is dressed in standard nun attire).

Accolades
The film received a nomination for worst film of the year by the Houston Film Critics Society.

Home mediaThe Three Stooges'' was released on DVD and Blu-ray on July 17, 2012.

Soundtrack

 "It's a Shame" - The Spinners (performed by cast members; Sean Hayes, Will Sasso, Chris Diamantopoulos and Jennifer Hudson)
 "Roadrunner" – The Modern Lovers
 "A Candle's Fire – Beirut
 "Walkie Talkie Man" – Steriogram
 "Pulled Up" – Talking Heads
 "Tongue Tied" – Grouplove
 "Can't Stop Thinking" – Buva
 "Dance Like A Monkey" – The New York Dolls
 "Get Crazy" – LMFAO
 "Feel Like Going Home" – Charlie Rich
 "Waste" – Foster the People
 "Si Señor Bob " – Papo Vazquez
 "Three Stooges" - Iggy Pop (performed by cast members; Sean Hayes, Will Sasso, Chris Diamantopoulos) 
 "Just Like Tom Thumb's Blues" – Bob Dylan

One song, while heard in the movie, is not included in the accompanying soundtrack - Jessica - The Allman Brothers Band

Possible Sequel
On May 7, 2015, a sequel was announced, with Hayes, Diamantopoulos and Sasso all reprising their roles. Cameron Fay was hired to write the script. Production was set to begin in 2018 but plans for the sequel were abandoned.
However, it was announced in December 2021 that development on the sequel had restarted.

References

External links 

 
 
 
 
 
 

2012 films
2010s screwball comedy films
American buddy comedy films
American slapstick comedy films
American screwball comedy films
Christianity in popular culture controversies
Cultural depictions of The Three Stooges
Films about Catholic nuns
Films about dysfunctional families
Films about orphans
Films about television
Films shot in Atlanta
Films directed by the Farrelly brothers
Films scored by John Debney
Films shot in Florida
Films with screenplays by the Farrelly brothers
The Three Stooges films
20th Century Fox films
2012 comedy films
American children's comedy films
2010s English-language films
2010s American films
Religious controversies in film
Religious controversies in the United States